José Montoya (May 28, 1932 – September 25, 2013) was a poet and an artist from Sacramento, California. He was one of the most influential Chicano bilingual poets. He has published many well-known poems in anthologies and magazines, and served as Sacramento's poet laureate.

Biography 
He was born in Albuquerque, New Mexico and raised, along with his brother, Malaquias Montoya, in the San Joaquin Valley in California. He and his family were migrant farm workers and Montoya started helping in the fields at age nine. The experience made Montoya decide that "farm work would not be his destiny." His mother was an artist herself, stenciling images for churches and homes and creating her own pigments and his experiences assisting her helped him think about becoming an artist.

From 1951 to 1955, he served in the United States Navy. After the Korean War, he used his G.I. Bill to go to college. He entered San Diego City College as an art student, Montoya later transferred to the California College of Arts & Crafts in Oakland, California. He graduated with a Bachelor of Arts in 1962. He began his career by teaching at Wheatland Union High School. Later, he earned his MA in 1971 from California State University, Sacramento. He taught Chicana/o studies in the Department of Art at California State University, Sacramento. Here, he worked for over twenty five years and started a unique program called the "Barrio Art Program." This program worked with student teachers who went into neighborhoods that were traditionally "under-served" in order to teach art to young people.

In the early 1970s, Montoya joined his students and members of the Chicano community to found the Rebel Chicano Art Front, later renamed the Royal Chicano Air Force, which supported the activities of Cesar Chavez and helped to advance the cause of the United Farm Worker's movement. The RCAF under Montoya and his artist comrades produced countless silk screen posters and organized numerous cultural, educational, and political activities in the Sacramento area and well beyond. They also did community work, such as the "Breakfast for Niños" program that served food to children in poor neighborhoods.

His poetic career was said to have begun with the publication of his poem, "La Jefita" (1969) in El Grito: A Journal of Contemporary Mexican-American Thought. His poetry was noted for using code switching, barrio slang and for its themes about struggling against injustice.

His son Richard Montoya is a member of the performance troupe Culture Clash.

"El Louie"
   Hoy enterraron al Louie.
   And San Pedro o san pinche
   Are in for it. And those 
   Times of the forties
   And the early fifties
   Lost un vato de atolle.

— El Louie, 1969

"El Louie" is probably Montoya's most famous and most often anthologized poem. With compassion and anger, it tells the story of Louie, a pachuco from San José and California's Central Valley who is a popular local figure.  After he comes back from the war in Korea his life disintegrates as he continues coming into conflict with the white-dominated world of California; he is a hero and a loser, hocking his combat medals for booze and drugs; he dies alone in squalid conditions.  Louie is not elevated to gangster sainthood, but he is "recognized as a normative model" rather than portrayed as deviant, dangerous or insignificant.

Works
Montoya, José. El Sol y Los De Abajo and other R.C.A.F. poems por José Montoya. San Francisco: Ediciones Pocho-che, 1972.
Montoya,  José. In Formation: 20 Years of Joda. Chusma House Publications, 1992.
Trio Casindio and the Royal Chicano Air Force.  20 Years of Songs by José Montoya.
Montoya, José. Los Compas: Chale Gallego y'l Xorty. Copilot Press, 2010.

See also

List of Chicano poets
Tortilla art

References

Sources
Elliott, Emory. The Columbia Literary History of the United States. NY: Columbia UP, 1988.
Hernandez, Guillermo E. Chicano Satire. 2 March 2004. https://web.archive.org/web/20040302235506/http://www.sscnet.ucla.edu/csrc/gmo/span145/articles/satirepgs52-84.html.  Austin: U of TX P, 1991.
Montoya,  José. In Formation: 20 Years of Joda.  Aztlán: Chusma House Publications, 1992.

External links

Guide to the Montoya José Papers from the California Ethnic and Multicultural Archives

1932 births
2013 deaths
American poets of Mexican descent
American artists of Mexican descent
Artists from Sacramento, California
California College of the Arts alumni
California State University, Sacramento alumni
California State University, Sacramento faculty
Deaths from lymphoma
Municipal Poets Laureate in the United States
Writers from Sacramento, California
20th-century American poets
United States Navy sailors